David Anthony Stewart Richards, Lord Richards of Camberwell, PC (born 9 June 1951) is a Justice of the Supreme Court of the United Kingdom.

Biography 
The son of Kenneth Richards, MBE and Winifred Richards, he was educated at Oundle School and Trinity College, Cambridge (BA 1973; MA 1980).

He was called to the bar at Inner Temple in 1974. He was made a QC in 1992 and judge of the High Court of Justice (Chancery Division) in 2003. He was appointed as a chairman of the Competition Appeal Tribunal in 2014.

He was appointed a Lord Justice of Appeal on 16 November 2015.  He retired on reaching the then applicable retirement age of 70 in June 2021.

On 17 August 2022, it was announced that Richards had been appointed as a Justice of the Supreme Court of the United Kingdom. Lord Richards was sworn in on 3 October 2022, when it was announced that he would take the judicial courtesy title of Lord Richards of Camberwell.

References

Living people
Members of the Privy Council of the United Kingdom
People educated at Oundle School
Alumni of Trinity College, Cambridge
Members of the Inner Temple
Chancery Division judges
Knights Bachelor
Lords Justices of Appeal
English King's Counsel
1951 births